The Sutro Baths was a large, privately owned public saltwater swimming pool complex in the Lands End area of the Outer Richmond District in western San Francisco, California.

Built in 1894, the Sutro Baths was located north of Ocean Beach, the Cliff House, Seal Rocks, and west of Sutro Heights Park. The structure burned down to its concrete foundation in June 1966; its ruins are located in the Golden Gate National Recreation Area and the Sutro Historic District.

History 
On March 14, 1896, the Sutro Baths were opened to the public as the world's largest indoor swimming pool establishment. The baths were built on the western side of San Francisco by wealthy entrepreneur and former mayor of San Francisco (1894–1896) Adolph Sutro.

The structure was situated in a small beach inlet below the Cliff House, also owned by Adolph Sutro at the time. Both the Cliff House and the former baths site are now a part of the Golden Gate National Recreation Area, operated by the United States National Park Service.  The baths struggled for years, mostly due to the very high operating and maintenance costs. Eventually, the southernmost part of the baths was converted into an ice skating rink, with a wall separating it from the dilapidated swimming pools, until 1964 when the property was sold to developers for a planned high-rise apartment complex.

A fire in 1966 destroyed the building while it was in the process of being demolished. All that remains of the site are concrete walls, blocked-off stairs and passageways, and a tunnel with a deep crevice in the middle. The cause of the fire was determined to be arson. Shortly afterwards, the developers left San Francisco and claimed insurance money.

Infrastructure and facilities 
The following statistics are from a 1912 article written by J. E. Van Hoosear of Pacific Gas and Electric.

During high tides, water would flow directly into the pools from the nearby ocean, recycling the two million US gallons (7,600 m³) of water in about an hour. During low tides, a powerful turbine water pump, built inside a cave at sea level, could be switched on from a control room and could fill the tanks at a rate of 6,000 US gallons a minute (380 L/s), recycling all the water in five hours.

Facilities included: 
 Six saltwater pools and one freshwater pool. They were equipped with seven slides, 30 swinging rings, and one springboard. 
 A museum displaying an extensive collection of stuffed and mounted animals, historic artifacts, and artwork, much of which Sutro acquired from the Woodward's Gardens estate sale in 1894
 A 2700-seat amphitheater, and club rooms with capacity for 1100
 517 private dressing rooms
 An ice skating rink

The baths were once served by two rail lines. The Ferries and Cliff House Railroad ran along the cliffs of Lands End overlooking the Golden Gate. The route ran from the baths to a terminal at California Street and Central Avenue, now Presidio Avenue. The second line was the Sutro Railroad, which ran electric trolleys to Golden Gate Park and downtown San Francisco. Both lines were later taken over by the Market Street Railway.

In popular culture
Media stored by the Library of Congress as part of the "American Memory" collection and available for viewing online:
 Sutro Baths, no. 1 and Sutro Baths, no. 2, filmed in 1897 by Thomas A. Edison, Inc.
 Leander Sisters, The Yellow Kid dance
 Panoramic view from a steam engine on the Ferries and Cliff House Railroad line route along the cliffs of Lands End, starting at the Sutro Baths depot, filmed in 1902 by Thomas A. Edison, Inc.
 Panoramic view from the beach below Cliff House at Sutro Baths, filmed in 1903 by American Mutoscope and Biograph Company.
The climax of the film The Lineup was shot at the ice skating rink in 1958.
Scene from the film  Harold and Maude shot at the ruins of the Sutro Baths.
Some parts of Earthquake Weather, the last piece of the Fault Lines Trilogy by Tim Powers, are set in and near Sutro Baths.
Part of the 2019 fantasy novel Middlegame by Seanan McGuire is set in Sutro Baths.
Key scenes from the Cory Doctorow young adult novels Little Brother and Homeland are set in the ruins of the Sutro Baths.

Ruins gallery

See also
 Sutro Historic District
 49-Mile Scenic Drive
 Lurline Baths
 Natatorium

References

External links

 NPS−Golden Gate National Recreation Area: Visiting Lands End
 NPS-GGNRA: Lands End History and Culture
 NPS-GGNRA: Vestiges of Lands End — digital guidebook.
 NPS-GGNRA: Sutro Bath and Cliff House webpage
 Sutro Baths Photographs

Former buildings and structures in San Francisco
Former public baths
Golden Gate National Recreation Area
Ruins in the United States
Swimming venues in San Francisco
Demolished buildings and structures in California
Landmarks in San Francisco
History of San Francisco
Richmond District, San Francisco
Buildings and structures completed in 1886
Buildings and structures demolished in 1966
1886 establishments in California
1966 disestablishments in California
Public baths in the United States
1966 in San Francisco